Patrícia Szölösi Sørensen (born 12 April 1991 in Tatabánya) is a Hungarian former professional handballer. She retired from professional handball in 2011. First she played in Iceland, currently plays for HØJ Håndbold in Denmark.

Achievements 
Nemzeti Bajnokság I:
Winner: 2008, 2009, 2010, 2011
Magyar Kupa:
Winner: 2008, 2009, 2010, 2011
EHF Champions League:
Finalist: 2009
Semifinalist: 2008, 2010, 2011

References

External links 
 Patricia Szölösi career statistics at Worldhandball

1991 births
Living people
People from Tatabánya
Hungarian female handball players
Győri Audi ETO KC players
Sportspeople from Komárom-Esztergom County